Bondiss is a summer village in Alberta, Canada. It is located at the eastern tip of Skeleton Lake, between Boyle and Lac La Biche.

Demographics 

In the 2016 Census of Population conducted by Statistics Canada, the Summer Village of Bondiss had a population of 110 living in 56 of its 195 total private dwellings, a  change from its 2011 population of 106.

See also 
List of communities in Alberta
List of summer villages in Alberta
List of resort villages in Saskatchewan

References

External links 

1983 establishments in Alberta
Summer villages in Alberta